Lao Khwan is a district (amphoe) in the northeastern part of Kanchanaburi province, central Thailand.

History
Laotian people moved to establish a new village in the area of Ban Ko Ban Kao. Later people from Bo Phloi moved to the area. When the government established a new town, they named it Ban Lao Khwan.

The minor district (king amphoe) Lao Khwan was created on 1 October 1971, when the three tambons 
Lao Khwan, Nong Sano, and Nong Pradu were split off from Phanom Thuan district. It was upgraded to a full district on 8 September 1976.

Geography

Neighboring districts are (from the south clockwise) Huai Krachao, Bo Phloi, Nong Prue of Kanchanaburi Province, Dan Chang, Nong Ya Sai, Don Chedi and U Thong of Suphanburi province.

Administration
The district is divided into seven sub-districts (tambons), which are further subdivided into 82 villages (mubans). Lao Khwan and Nong Fai are two townships (thesaban tambon), each covering parts of the same-named tambons. There are a further seven tambon administrative organizations (TAO).

Ban Nong Pradu is a village in the Nong Pradu subdistrict. It is known as the setting of the popular Thai martial arts film Ong-Bak starring Tony Jaa.

References

External links
amphoe.com

Lao Khwan